Sazi Sandi (born 11 August 1998) is a South African rugby union player for the  in Super Rugby. His regular position is prop.

Sandi was named in the  squad for the 2020 Super Rugby season.

References

South African rugby union players
Living people
1998 births
Rugby union props
Stormers players
Western Province (rugby union) players
Rugby union players from East London, Eastern Cape